The 1999 NHL Entry Draft was the 37th NHL Entry Draft. It was held on June 26 at the FleetCenter in Boston. According to Sports Illustrated and other sports news agencies, at the time the 1999 draft was considered one of the deepest in talent in years, headed by Patrik Stefan and the Sedin twins, Daniel and Henrik.

As a result of the draft lottery, the first three picks going into draft day were held by the Tampa Bay Lightning, the Atlanta Thrashers expansion team, and the Vancouver Canucks, respectively. The Canucks were determined to select both Sedins and therefore initiated a trading carousel involving multiple teams. After the trading was done, the Lightning had traded out of the first round altogether while the Thrashers held the first overall pick. However, Atlanta had also agreed not to draft either of the Sedin twins. The Thrashers therefore selected Stefan while the Canucks used the second and third picks to select the Sedins.

The overall impact in the NHL of players selected has not matched that of the neighboring drafts. An example is how many first round picks have played the equivalent of an entire regular season ten seasons after the 1999 draft; only 16 out of 28 first round picks in 1999 have played 82 NHL games, while the same statistic applies to 23 out of 27 players in 1998 and 21 out of 30 players in 2000. In addition, while the Sedin twins have excelled in the NHL, only Barret Jackman and Martin Havlat were still active players of the other 26 first-round picks in the NHL 15 years after the draft.

As of 2023, the only remaining active player in the NHL from the 1999 draft class is Craig Anderson, although he was re-drafted in 2001.

Selections by round
Club teams are located in North America unless otherwise noted.

Round one

Round two

Round three

Round four

Round five

Round six

Round seven

Round eight

Round nine

Draftees based on nationality

Sedin Trades

Vancouver GM Brian Burke was determined to draft Daniel and Henrik Sedin, after their performance at the 1999 IIHF World Championship in Oslo, Norway. He began by complementing his existing third overall pick by trading defenseman Bryan McCabe and Vancouver's 1st-round pick in the 2000 Draft (used to select Pavel Vorobiev) to the Chicago Blackhawks for the fourth overall pick. Then he obtained the first overall pick from Tampa Bay, flipping Chicago's fourth overall pick — which the Lightning subsequently traded to the Rangers, who used it to draft Pavel Brendl — and two third-round selections. Vancouver and Atlanta then worked out a deal whereby Atlanta, who held the second overall selection, promised to select Patrik Stefan with the first overall pick, leaving both Sedins available to Vancouver at 2nd and 3rd.

See also
 1999 NHL Expansion Draft
 1999–2000 NHL season
 List of NHL first overall draft choices
 List of NHL players

References

External links
 1999 NHL Entry Draft player stats at The Internet Hockey Database
 prosportstransactions.com: 1999 NHL Entry Draft Pick

Draft
National Hockey League Entry Draft
National Hockey League in New England
1999 in sports in Massachusetts
1999 in Boston